Farhat Hasan is an Indian politician and member of the Bahujan Samaj Party. He represented Hasanpur (Assembly constituency) in the 2007 Uttar Pradesh Legislative Assembly election.

References 

Living people
Bahujan Samaj Party politicians
Year of birth missing (living people)